Havelian Cantonment is a cantonment adjacent to Havelian in Abbottabad District, Khyber Pakhtunkhwa, Pakistan.

References

Cantonments of Pakistan